Peronospora antirrhini is a plant pathogen. It causes downy mildew on leaves of species of Antirrhinum and related genera (e.g. Misopates).

The disease is generally of minor importance, but can be damaging on antirrhinum seedlings in the glasshouse, which may be systemically infected.

References

Further reading

External links

Water mould plant pathogens and diseases
Ornamental plant pathogens and diseases
Peronosporales
Species described in 1874